Pocho Aztlan is the fourth studio album by American extreme metal band Brujeria, released on September 16, 2016 through Nuclear Blast. This is the first full-length studio album by Brujeria since Brujerizmo, marking the longest gap between the band's studio albums. It is also the first release featuring El Cynico, El Sangron and Cuernito.

Pocho Aztlan marks the return of their older grindcore sound from early releases, like Matando Güeros, while maintaining the groove-oriented sound the band explored in Brujerizmo.

Track listing

Credits
Brujeria
 Juan Brujo (Juan Lepe) – lead vocals (1, 9, 10)
 Pititis (Gabriela Dominguez) – guitars, backing vocals
 Hongo – guitars, songwriting (2, 4–8, 11, 12)
 El Cynico – bass, backing vocals, songwriting (3)
 Fantasma – bass, backing vocals
 Pinche Peach – samples, backing vocals
 Hongo Jr. – drums (1–11)

Additionnel Personnel
Juan Ramón Rufino Ramos – vocals/narration (1)
El Podrido – drums (12, 13)

Songwriting on "California über Aztlan"
Jello Biafra 
John Greenway

2016 albums
Brujeria (band) albums
Nuclear Blast albums